Mongolian beef  is a dish from Taiwan consisting of sliced beef, typically flank steak, usually made with onions. The beef is commonly paired with scallions or mixed vegetables and is often not spicy. The dish is often served over steamed rice, or in the US, over crispy fried cellophane noodles. It is a staple dish of American Chinese restaurants. Despite its name, the dish has nothing to do with Mongolian cuisine.

Mongolian beef is among the meat dishes developed in Taiwan where Mongolian barbecue restaurants first appeared. Thus, none of the ingredients or the preparation methods are drawn from traditional Mongolian cuisine but from Chinese cuisine. A variation is known as Mongolian lamb which substitutes the beef in the dish for lamb.

See also
 Mongolian barbecue
 Taiwanese cuisine

References

American Chinese cuisine
Beef dishes
Taiwanese cuisine